Polyhymnia, alternatively Polymnia (Πολύμνια), was, in Greek mythology, the Muse of sacred poetry, sacred hymn, dance and eloquence, as well as agriculture and pantomime.

Etymology 
Polyhymnia name comes from the Greek words "poly", meaning "many", and "hymnos", which means "praise".

Appearance 
Polymnia is depicted as very serious, pensive and meditative, and often holding a finger to her mouth, dressed in a long cloak and veil and resting her elbow on a pillar. Polyhymnia is also sometimes credited as being the Muse of geometry and meditation.

In Bibliotheca historica, Diodorus Siculus wrote, "Polyhymnia, because by her great (polle) praises (humnesis) she brings distinction to writers whose works have won for them immortal fame...".

Family 
As one of the Muses, Polyhymnia was the daughter of Zeus and the Titaness Mnemosyne. She was also described as the mother of Triptolemus by Cheimarrhoos, son of Ares, and of the musician Orpheus by Apollo.

Dedications 
On Mount Parnassus, there was a spring that was sacred to Polyhymnia and the other Muses. It was said to flow between two big rocks above Delphi, then down into a large square basin. The water was used by the Pythia, who were priests and priestesses, for oracular purposes including divination.

In popular culture 

 In astronomy, there are ten asteroids named after the Muses, and moons named after another two. The one named after Polyhymnia is a main belt asteroid discovered by Jean Chacornac, a French astronomer, in 1854.
 Polyhymnia appears in Dante's Divine Comedy: Paradiso. Canto XXIII, line 56, and is referenced in modern works of fiction.

Gallery

See also
 Muses in popular culture

Notes

References 
 Diodorus Siculus, The Library of History translated by Charles Henry Oldfather. Twelve volumes. Loeb Classical Library. Cambridge, Massachusetts: Harvard University Press; London: William Heinemann, Ltd. 1989. Vol. 3. Books 4.59–8. Online version at Bill Thayer's Web Site
 Diodorus Siculus, Bibliotheca Historica. Vol 1-2. Immanel Bekker. Ludwig Dindorf. Friedrich Vogel. in aedibus B. G. Teubneri. Leipzig. 1888-1890. Greek text available at the Perseus Digital Library.

External links

Primary sources and basic information concerning Polyhymnia
Polyhymnia in painting
Warburg Institute Iconographic Database (ca 50 images of Polyhymnia)

Greek Muses
Children of Zeus
Music in Greek mythology
Ancient Greek theatre
Music and singing goddesses
Wisdom goddesses
Metamorphoses characters